Zonaria pyrum, common name the pear cowry, is a species of sea snail, a cowry, a marine gastropod mollusk in the family Cypraeidae, the cowries.

Description
They are very variable in pattern and colour. The surface is smooth and shiny, their basic color is usually orange-brown, with many brown spots and two or three clear trasversal bands. The base, the margins and the teeth are orange or pinkish. In the living cowries mantle and foot are quite developed, with external antennae. The mantle is orange-reddish, with yellow papillae. The lateral flaps may hide completely the shell surface and may be quickly retracted into the shell opening.

Distribution 
This species occurs in the Mediterranean Sea to southwest Africa, off Morocco, Tunisia, Libya, Italy, Lampedusa Island, Sicily, Malta, Greece, Turkey, Senegal, Gabon and Angola.

Habitat
They are omnivore-grazer, mainly feeding at night on sponges, algae and corals.

Subspecies 
 Zonaria pyrum angolensis Odhner, 1923
 Zonaria pyrum pyrum Gmelin, 1791
 Zonaria pyrum senegalensis Schilder, 1928

References 
 Repetto G., Orlando F. & Arduino G. (2005): Conchiglie del Mediterraneo, Amici del Museo "Federico Eusebio", Alba, Italy

External links 
 Biolib
 

Cypraeidae
Gastropods described in 1791
Taxa named by Johann Friedrich Gmelin